Malika Auger-Aliassime (born December 28, 1998) is a Canadian tennis player. She reached a career high junior rank of No. 554 on February 15, 2016.

Early life
Auger-Aliassime was born to Togolese father Sam Aliassime and Quebecker mother Marie Auger in Montreal, Quebec. She was raised in L'Ancienne-Lorette, a suburb of Quebec City. Her younger brother Félix is also a tennis player. She picked up a racquet for the first time at 6 and was a member of the Académie de Tennis Hérisset-Bordeleau in Quebec City in her early years, coached by her father Sam. She is currently living in Montreal.

Tennis career

2015–present
Auger-Aliassime made her professional debut at the 2015 Coupe Banque Nationale in September where she lost in the qualifying first round. She made her WTA Tour debut at the same tournament, having received a wildcard with Charlotte Petrick into the doubles main draw. They were defeated by Barbora Krejčíková and An-Sophie Mestach in the first round.

References

External links

1998 births
Living people
Black Canadian sportswomen
Canadian female tennis players
Canadian people of Togolese descent
Tennis players from Montreal